The Embassy of Eritrea in Washington, D.C. is the State of Eritrea's diplomatic mission to the United States. It's located at 1708 New Hampshire Avenue, Northwest, Washington, D.C., in the Dupont Circle neighborhood. 
The Eritrean Consulate office in Oakland, California was closed on 1 October 2007.

The Ambassador is Ghirmai Ghebremariam.

References

External links
Official website
wikimapia

Eritrea
Washington, D.C.
Eritrea–United States relations
Dupont Circle